David Meale is an American diplomat and the current Deputy Chief of Mission for the Embassy of the United States in Beijing. Prior to this, he served as the Chargé d'affaires for the embassy from July 2021 to March 2022 - in this capacity, he was the senior United States diplomat in China while the Biden Administration's nominee for the Ambassador to China, R. Nicholas Burns, awaited confirmation. Previously, Meale served as the Deputy Assistant Secretary for Trade Policy and Negotiations at the Bureau of Economic and Business Affairs.

Career 
In December 2018, Meale became the deputy assistant secretary for trade policy and negotiations at the Bureau of Economic and Business Affairs, a division of the United States Department of State.

Meale visited Taiwan in April 2019, meeting President Tsai Ing-wen and speaking at the American Chamber of Commerce in Taipei during the 40th anniversary of the Taiwan Relations Act.

References 

Living people
21st-century American diplomats
United States Department of State officials
Ambassadors of the United States to China
Year of birth missing (living people)
People of the American Institute in Taiwan